Stinky Peterson may refer to:

 A character from Hey Arnold!
 A character from The Red Green Show
 A character from Recess